The Boston Major was a professional Dota 2 esports tournament that took place in Boston in the United States. The main event was played live at the Wang Theatre from December 7–10, 2016. Like other tournaments in the Dota 2 Major Championship series, the event featured 16 teams from around the world and had a $3,000,000 prize pool, with the victor winning $1,000,000. The event was presented and produced by PGL, who also had the same role at the previous Major in Manila.

Unlike previous Dota 2 Majors, the Boston Major was the first one to have a single elimination bracket. The event was won by OG, their third Dota 2 Major championship victory, who defeated Ad Finem in the best-of-five grand finals 3–1.

Teams

Tournament

Groups

Group A

Group B

Group C

Group D

Bracket
All series were played to a best-of-three, with the exception being the best-of-five grand finals.

Results 
(Note: Prizes are in USD)

Notes

References

External links

Dota 2 Majors
2016 in Boston
2016 in esports
2016 in sports in Massachusetts
December 2016 sports events in the United States
Esports competitions in the United States
Professional Gamers League competitions
Sports competitions in Boston